Futurists is a 1986 play by British playwright Dusty Hughes.  It was first produced at the Cottesloe, Royal National Theatre, directed by Richard Eyre.

References
 

Plays by Dusty Hughes
1986 plays